Osidryas phyllodes is a moth in the Copromorphidae family. It is found in Australia, where it has been recorded from Queensland.

References

Natural History Museum Lepidoptera generic names catalog

Copromorphidae
Moths described in 1916